Marcos Baselga García (born 15 February 1999) is a Spanish footballer who plays as a forward for CD Calahorra, on loan from Real Zaragoza.

Club career
Baselga was born in Zaragoza, Aragon, and was a Real Zaragoza youth graduate. He made his senior debut with the reserves on 27 August 2017, playing the last five minutes in a 1–1 Segunda División B away draw against Lleida Esportiu.

Baselga scored his first senior goal on 2 September 2018, scoring the second in a 4–0 home routing of CF Calamocha. Roughly one year later, he scored four times in a 6–0 thrashing of CD Binéfar.

On 14 May 2020, Baselga renewed his contract until 2024 and was definitely promoted to the first team for the 2020–21 season. He made his professional debut on 20 July, coming on as a late substitute for Jannick Buyla in a 2–1 home win against SD Ponferradina in the Segunda División.

On 25 September 2020, Baselga was loaned to CD Atlético Baleares of the third division for a year.

On 29 July 2021, Baselga was loaned to Zamora of the Primera División RFEF for a year.

References

External links

1999 births
Living people
Footballers from Zaragoza
Spanish footballers
Association football forwards
Segunda División players
Primera Federación players
Segunda División B players
Tercera División players
Real Zaragoza B players
Real Zaragoza players
CD Atlético Baleares footballers
Zamora CF footballers
CD Calahorra players